Aldobrandini Madonna may refer to:

The Garvagh Madonna, also known as the Aldobrandini Madonna and Aldobrandini-Garvagh Madonna, a painting by Raphael
The Aldobrandini Madonna (Titian)